Deh-e Afghan-e Bar Ahuyi (also Romanized as Deh-e Afghan-e Bar Āhūyī; also known as Deh-e Afghān-e Barāvī) is a village in Margan Rural District, in the Central District of Hirmand County, Sistan and Baluchestan Province, Iran. At the 2006 census, its population was 161 people with 35 families.

References 

Populated places in Hirmand County